The 2013 Match des Champions was the 8th edition of the annual super cup game in French basketball. This year the reigning LNB Pro A champions JSF Nanterre faced off against French Cup champions Paris-Levallois Basket. The game was played in the Vendéspace in Mouilleron-le-Captif. Boxscore

Match

References

2013
Match